The dusky-chested flycatcher (Myiozetetes luteiventris) is a species of bird in the family Tyrannidae.
It is found in Bolivia, Brazil, Colombia, Ecuador, French Guiana, Peru, Suriname, and Venezuela.
Its natural habitats are subtropical or tropical moist lowland forests and subtropical or tropical swamps.

References

dusky-chested flycatcher
Birds of the Guianas
Birds of the Amazon Basin
Birds of the Colombian Amazon
Birds of the Venezuelan Amazon
Birds of the Peruvian Amazon
Birds of the Bolivian Amazon
dusky-chested flycatcher
dusky-chested flycatcher
Taxonomy articles created by Polbot